Nissim Mannathukkaren is an associate professor and chair in Dalhousie University's Department of International Development Studies in Halifax, Nova Scotia, Canada. The Rupture with Memory: Derrida and the Specters that Haunt Marxism is his first book (2006).

Biography

Early life and education
He is from Muvattupuzha, Kerala, India and currently resides in Canada. He completed his B.A degree in Politics, Economics and History from Bangalore University, M.A degree in Political Science and MPhil degrees in Political Science from Jawaharlal Nehru University and PhD degree in Political Studies from Queen's University, Canada. .

Views

Caste system
Mannathukkaren writes in the final paragraph of his Being the privileged article, "Let us, similarly, in an upper caste-dominated society, acknowledge the vast undeserved space we occupy. Let us cede what has to be ceded.

Publications

Books
 Rupture with Memory: Derrida and the Specters that Haunt Marxism
 Communism, Subaltern Studies and Postcolonial Theory: The Left in South India

Book chapters
 Nissim Mannathukkaren. (2018) The ‘people’ and the ‘political’. In Mujibur Rehman. (author) Rise of Saffron Power. 1st Edition, Routledge. Pages 26.
 Nissim Mannathukkaren, 2010, Reading cricket fiction in the times of Hindu nationalism and farmer suicides: Fallacies of textual interpretation, The Politics of Sport in South Asia, Routledge, 26.

Articles
In India's English-language press, he writes op-eds for The Hindu,The Wire,Indian Express,Telegraph,Outlook, Scroll, Quint,Deccan Chronicle, Newsclick, Citizen, openDemocracy, The Kochi Post, Janata Weekly and so forth.

The wire
A Communal Virus and Our Collective Irrationality

open Democracy
 Modi government and the muzzling of the Indian media

Research
Mannathukkaren's research interests are primarily in the areas of  Left and communist movements, Development and democracy, Modernity, Politics of popular culture and Marxist and postcolonial theories. 
Citizenship Studies, Journal of Peasant Studies, Third World Quarterly, Economic and Political Weekly, Journal of Critical Realism, International Journal of the History of Sport, Dialectical Anthropology, Inter-Asia Cultural Studies, and Sikh Formations are among the journals that have published his work.

 Communalism sans violence: A Keralan exceptionalism?

Book reviews
 Vinay Gidwani, Capital, Interrupted: Agrarian Development and the Politics of Work in India, 2009, Journal of Peasant Studies, Vol. 36, No. 2, 2009, 464–466.

Recognition
 2000, The Commonwealth Scholarship and Fellowship Plan (CSFP) scholarship, for doctoral studies.
 2010, The Social Sciences and Humanities Research Council of Canada (SSHRC) research award, for his project ‘Unveiling the Janus of Modernity: A Case Study of Kerala”.

Controversies
Nissim Mannathukkaren was one of the 250 writers and cultural activists who demanded the restoration of Article 370 of the Constitution of India, and the restoration of the state of Jammu & Kashmir.

Bibliography

See also
 List of Dalhousie University people

References

External links

 Nissim Mannathukkaren at Dalhousie University
 @nmannathukkaren at Twitter
 Nissim Mannathukkaren (@Nissim@mastodon.social) at Mastodon
 Dr. Nissim Mannathukkaren at NextGen Database
 

Bangalore University alumni
Indian columnists
Indian male writers
Indian political writers
Jawaharlal Nehru University alumni
Living people
Opinion journalism
Opinion journalists
Political writers
Queen's University at Kingston alumni
The Hindu journalists
The Wire (magazine) writers
Indian Marxist writers
Indian newspaper journalists
Outlook (Indian magazine) people
The Times of India journalists
People from Kerala
People from Muvattupuzha
The Wire
Indian Express Limited people
The Daily Telegraph people
Dalhousie University
Academic staff of the Dalhousie University
Indian scholars
Year of birth missing (living people)